The Greenlandic film industry produced over ten feature films in 2014. This article fully lists all non-pornographic films, including short films, that had a release date in that year and which were at least partly made by Greenland (a self-governing territory of Denmark). It does not include films first released in previous years that had release dates in 2014.  Also included is an overview of the major events in Greenlandic film, including film festivals and awards ceremonies, as well as lists of those films that have been particularly well received, both critically and financially.

Minor releases

See also

 2014 in film
 List of Greenlandic films
 List of Greenlandic submissions for the Academy Award for Best Foreign Language Film
 List of Danish films of 2014

References

External links

Greenlandic
Films

Greenland